The City of Cincinnati parks system has five regional and 70 neighborhood parks and 34 nature preserves operated by the Cincinnati Park Board. The following is an (incomplete) list of these protected areas in Cincinnati, Ohio:

West Side
Bracken Woods
Buttercup Valley
Fernbank Park
LaBoiteaux Woods
Lincoln Park (demolished)
McEvoy Park
Mt. Airy Forest
Mt. Echo Park
Parkers Woods
Rapid Run Park

Central
Avon Woods
Bellevue Hill Park
Bradford-Felter Tanglewood
Burnet Woods
Caldwell Preserve
Eden Park
Krohn Conservatory
Fleischmann Gardens
Fountain Square
Friendship Park
Hauck Botanic Gardens
Hopkins Park
Inwood Park
Jackson Hill Park
Lytle Park
Mt. Storm Park
Piatt Park
Sawyer Point
Smale Riverfront Park
Washington Park

East Side
Alms Park
Annwood Park
Ault Park
Bettman Preserve
California Woods
Daniel Drake Park
French Park
Hyde Park Square
Kennedy Heights Park
Otto Armleder
Owl's Nest Park
Stanbery Park

References

Cincinnati
Parks